Vishal Ranjan Mishra is a Hindi film writer and director, known for his films like Coffee with D, Marudhar Express, Hotel Milan and Ae Kaash Ke Hum.

He recently announced his two films, Iti and Rosie: The Saffron Chapter.

Early life 
Vishal Ranjan Mishra was born and brought up in Kanpur, Uttar Pradesh where he completed his schooling. He went on to join NIFT Bengaluru to pursue his MBA in Fashion.

Personal life 
He is married to Khyati Madaan and they both live in Mumbai.

Career 
He started his career as a film critic and a short film director. He made two short films and was awarded the Best Debut Director at the Rio Film Festival in 2009 for his short film The Musk.

His debuted as a director with Coffee with D starring Sunil Grover, Dipannita Sharma and Anjana Sukhani. The film released in cinemas on Jan, 2017. The director and makers of the film received threat calls from Chhota Shakeel, asking them to either delete the portions that make fun of underworld don Dawood Ibrahim in the film or not release the film at all. Vishal Mishra won the Best New Age Film Director Award for this film, at the 10th Global Film Festival by the Asian Academy of Film & Television (AAFT).

He then directed Marudhar Express starring Kunaal Roy Kapur, Tara Alisha Berry and Rajesh Sharma, released in cinemas on 5 July 2019. It is a sweet small-town romantic film set in Kanpur. He also directed Hotel Milan starring Kunaal Roy Kapur, Zeishan Quadri, Jaideep Ahlawat, Rajesh Sharma, Karishma Sharma and Zakir Hussain. The film Hotel Milan is based on Anti Romeo squad and moral policing in UP that released in cinemas on 16 November 2018.

His upcoming movie is called Ae Kaash Ke Hum which revolves around three youngsters and story of their love, friendship and fate. The film is slated to release on 17 January 2020.

He recently announced his two films, to be produced by Vivek Oberoi - Iti and Rosie: The Saffron Chapter.

In addition to this, he also wrote the lyrics for the song Heeriye from the movie Happy Hardy and Heer and he also penned the lyrics for Chaasni Si, a song from Marudhar Express, a movie he also directed.

Filmography

References

External links
 

1978 births
Living people
Indian filmmakers
Hindi-language film directors
Film directors from Uttar Pradesh
Screenwriters from Uttar Pradesh
National Institute of Fashion Technology alumni